Skynet 5C is the third of four Skynet 5 military communications satellites to be used by the British Ministry of Defence (MOD).

Launch 
It was launched from French Guiana aboard an Ariane 5ECA carrier rocket at 22:05:02 GMT on 12 June 2008. The launch was originally scheduled for 23 May, but was delayed to 30 May, and then delayed again due to software problems with the carrier rocket. Originally built as a ground spare satellite, the decision to launch was made in 2007. Arianespace provided launch services.

Spacecraft 
It was constructed by EADS Astrium under a contract to its subsidiary company Paradigm Secure Communications, who will operate the satellite on behalf of the MoD. Based on the Eurostar E3000 satellite bus, it has a mass of 4,700 kilograms, and an expected on-orbit lifetime of 15 years.

Skynet 5C is part of a constellation of communications satellites for the United Kingdom Ministry of Defense that supports nuclear hardened and protected military X-band and UHF frequency capabilities.

Skynet 5C is located at 17.8 degrees West.

References

Communications satellites in geostationary orbit
Military satellites
Spacecraft launched in 2008
Satellites using the Eurostar bus
Spacecraft launched by Ariane rockets